Xylorhiza confertifolia, the Henrieville woody-aster, is a rare species of flowering plant in the family Asteraceae, known only from Garfield and Kane counties in southern Utah. The common name for the species refers to the Town of Henrieville, in Garfield County.

Flower heads are borne singly, with white ray and yellow disc flowers.

References

Astereae
Flora of Utah
Flora of the Colorado Plateau and Canyonlands region
Endemic flora of the United States
Flora without expected TNC conservation status
Taxa named by Arthur Cronquist